Yengica (also, Yengicə, Yengidzha, and Yengidzhe) is a village and municipality in the Qabala Rayon of Azerbaijan.  It has a population of 458. The village is dominated by a single 5-storey spa resort.

References 

Populated places in Qabala District